Calf Island  is an island in the Detroit River, in Michigan.  It has a surface elevation of 571 feet (174 m). It is located in the Trenton Channel about 1,000 feet (304 m) west of the southern tip of Grosse Ile and Swan Island, and Hamburg Island is just to the northwest.  The 7-acre (2.8 ha) island is administered locally by Grosse Ile Township.

Added in 2002, Calf Island was one of the newer additions to the Detroit River International Wildlife Refuge.  Under the refuge, the Michigan Department of Natural Resources and Ontario Ministry of Natural Resources identifies more than 29 species of waterfowl and 65 kinds of fish that make their home in and around the waters of Calf Island.  The island often serves as a nesting location for a small number of herons.  Calf Island is the smallest property added to the refuge, and the island has remained relatively isolated and unused compared to other areas in the region.

See also
Detroit River International Wildlife Refuge
List of islands of Michigan
List of islands in the Detroit River

References

Islands of Wayne County, Michigan
Islands of the Detroit River
River islands of Michigan
Uninhabited islands of Michigan